Tống Anh Tỷ (born 24 January 1997) is a Vietnamese footballer who plays as a central midfielder for Becamex Bình Dương.

Honours
Becamex Bình Dương
Vietnamese National Cup: Runner-up 2017
Vietnamese Super Cup: 2016; Runner-up 2019

External links

References 

1997 births
Living people
Vietnamese footballers
Association football midfielders
V.League 1 players
Becamex Binh Duong FC players
Hoa people